Dary is both a surname and a given name. Notable people with the name include:

Surname
Alan Dary, actor
Bruno Dary (born 1952), French general

Given name
Dary John Mizelle (born 1940), American composer
Dary (footballer) (born 1940), full name Dary Batista de Oliveira, Brazilian football midfielder
Dary Matera (born 1955), American non-fiction crime writer
Dary Myricks (born 1976), American football offensive linemen

See also
Dari (disambiguation)